H. coronarium  may refer to:
 Hedysarum coronarium, the French honeysuckle or cock's head, a perennial herb species native to Northern Africa and Spain
 Hedychium coronarium, the white ginger lily, a plant species originally from the Himalayas region of Nepal and India

See also
 Coronarium